The Oberaarjoch Hut (German: Oberaarjochhütte) is a mountain hut of the Swiss Alpine Club, located north of Fieschertal in the canton of Valais, close to the canton of Bern. The hut lies at a height of 3,258 metres above sea level at the foot of the Oberaarhorn, just above the Oberaarjoch, the glacier pass connecting the Fiescher Glacier from the Oberaar Glacier. All accesses to the hut involve glacier crossing.

See also
List of buildings and structures above 3000 m in Switzerland

References
Swisstopo topographic maps

External links
Official website

Mountain huts in Switzerland
Mountain huts in the Alps